Ruth Roberts (August 31, 1926 – June 30, 2011) was an American songwriter.

Life and career
She was born in Port Chester, New York, to Robert and Lillian Mulwitz.  She was educated at Port Chester High School, Northwestern University, and the Juilliard School.

She had a long professional collaboration with lyricist Bill Katz. Their most notable collaboration was the 1961 fight song "Meet the Mets", the official theme song of the New York Mets of Major League Baseball. Some of Roberts' other songs included "The First Thing Ev'ry Morning (And the Last Thing Ev'ry Night)" (co-written with and recorded by Jimmy Dean) and "Mailman, Bring Me No More Blues". The latter song was first recorded by Buddy Holly on his 1958 self-titled album. It was later recorded by The Beatles in 1969 for their album Let It Be, but their version was not released until 1996.

She died in Rye Brook, New York.  She was married to Gene Piller a Hollywood screenwriter.  She was the mother of Michael Piller, screenwriter/producer best known for three Star Trek series and Dead Zone.

References

1926 births
2011 deaths
Juilliard School alumni
Northwestern University alumni
People from Port Chester, New York
Songwriters from New York (state)
People from Rye Brook, New York
American women songwriters
21st-century American women